Caleb Pillay (born 29 October 2000) is a South African cricketer. He made his first-class debut on 24 October 2019, for KwaZulu-Natal Inland in the 2019–20 CSA 3-Day Provincial Cup.

References

External links
 

2000 births
Living people
South African cricketers
KwaZulu-Natal Inland cricketers
Place of birth missing (living people)